Sir William Carter (25 May 1848 – 14 October 1932) was an English insurance executive who was elected Mayor of Windsor, Berkshire, thirteen times.

Carter was born in Marlow, Buckinghamshire, and became a painter and decorator and later a gardener. He then joined the Prudential Assurance Company as a clerk and served successively at their offices in Marlow, Maidenhead and Windsor, becoming superintendent of the Windsor office in 1879 and remaining there until his retirement in 1908.

He was elected to Windsor Town Council in November 1902 and became an Alderman in November 1922. He served as mayor from 1908 to 1928, serving throughout the First World War when there were no elections. For these services he was knighted in the 1920 New Year Honours.

Footnotes

References
Obituary, The Times, 15 October 1932

1848 births
1932 deaths
Mayors of places in Berkshire
Knights Bachelor
People from Marlow, Buckinghamshire